Harare Polytechnic College, formerly Salisbury Polytechnic and commonly referred to as Harare Polytechnic, is a technical, public research university in Causeway, Harare. The university is known for its strength in science and engineering, and is one among a small group of technical schools or institutes of technology in Zimbabwe which are primarily devoted to the instruction of pure and applied sciences. The school was founded on the  British polytechnic model offering standard and higher diplomas and undergraduate degrees, unlike  European and  American institutions which often offer postgraduate degrees and a strong emphasis on research. At the outset, the focus of polytechnics was on STEM subjects with a special emphasis on engineering.

History
Salisbury Polytechnic was established in 1919 by George Challoner, credited as the "father" of technical education in Rhodesia, started mechanical engineering classes for a small group of young white men. Classes were held in various schools and halls until an official Polytechnic campus was established just before the Second World War on the site between Fourth and Fifth Streets in Harare, Zimbabwe. 

By the time of the establishment of the Federation of Rhodesia and Nyasaland, the school expanded and though it technically allowed all students to attend following the example of the University of Zimbabwe, it was overwhelmingly dominated by white, male students due to tuition costs, discrimination and a stigma against female students in trade professions. At the time technical education in Southern Africa, lagged far behind that of Western Europe and the United States, with just three polytechnics across Rhodesia, in Salisbury, Bulawayo and Ndola and a handful of technikons in South Africa. In pre-war Rhodesia, the majority of demand for skilled technical labour, was in mining, particularly in on the Copperbelt, followed by gold, coal and chrome mining in the south. Lesser opportunities existed with Rhodesian Railways and in town planning and real estate, thus the bulk of skilled labour concentrated in the Witwatersrand and the emerging Copperbelt, putting the Southern Rhodesian economy at a distinct disadvantage.  

In order to remedy this and prevent graduates from leaving for better opportunities abroad, the government began to invest in technical education. The federal government commissioned the Keir Report, the result of which led to all three governments, opening higher education to people of all races. The Garfield Todd government in turn, had recently liberalised education for African students and hoped that trade school would be an avenue of creating opportunities for Africans while also responding to the needs of an increasingly industrializing economy. The government sponsored a two-year diploma in fields as varied as engineering and town planning, with many students going on to study at institutions in the United Kingdom before returning to service the booming economy. As a result, the modern  Harare Polytechnic commenced operations in 1964 at its present location after construction work, which cost 275,000 pounds. Increased funding also led to the first wave of Coloured (mixed-race), Asian and black students at the school, albeit as a small minority of the student body. Unfortunately, the election of Ian Smith led to a racist backlash that hindered African education until 1980.

Modern developments
Harare Polytechnic's goal is to be one of the regions leading hubs of intellectual excellence in scientific, technical, vocational engineering,  and technological education in preparing students for the growing knowledge economy. The school initially boomed in post independence Zimbabwe with a growth in students and funding. It has grown from one department to 17 departments and divisions.

Challenges
As in the UK and much of the Commonwealth, polytechnics were often seen as less prestigious than universities in the provision of higher education, because they lacked degree-awarding powers, concentrated on applied science and engineering education, were smaller and thus produced less research than the universities, and because the qualifications necessary to gain admission to the Polytechnic are generally lower than for a university (the failure rate in the first year of undergraduate courses is high, due to a rigorous filtering process).

However, in terms of an undergraduate education, this was a misconception, since many polytechnics offered academic degrees validated by the Ministry of Higher Education, Science and Technology, from diploma to bachelor's degrees. In addition, professional degrees in subjects such as engineering, town planning, law, and architecture are validated by various professional institutions such at the Zimbabwe Institute of Architects and the Standards Association of Zimbabwe. Thus technical schools such have traditionally received less funding than research universities like the University of Zimbabwe. However the growth of knowledge, tech and professional services has made polytechnic education more relevant for professional work in applying science and advanced technology in industry.

Another challenge has been Zimbabwe's economic crisis, which has led to decreased funding for education, and made it more difficult to retain faculty and students, many of whom chose to go to university abroad, often emigrating entirely. The school is increasingly dependent on expatriate former lecturers and alumni for funding, with much of the current equipment increasingly old and obsolete. Despite, this Harare Polytechnic has fared better than the University of Zimbabwe, which is often plagued by teacher and student strikes, intermittent closing and an overall decline in standards. This is largely due to the schools small size and focus of applied sciences and technology, allowing for a smaller staff as well as its affordable tuition, which makes it a draw for local students who cannot afford to study aboard. Additionally, the school is also a magnet for international students from countries to the north, particularly Zambia and Malawi who do not have the same standard of technical education in their home countries.

Admissions
Harare Polytechnic, like similar schools in the UK, has a relatively open admission policy and affordable tuition.
The school offers degrees at the following levels:
 national higher certificate (2 years)
 national diploma (3 years).
 2 years of theoretical training, and
 1 year of experiential training with an industrial employer
 national higher diploma (4 years) 
 bachelor's degree in technology (B-Tech: 4 years)

References

External links 
 

 
Educational institutions established in 1919
1919 establishments in Southern Rhodesia
Education in Harare